The 3rd East Asian Games were held in Osaka, Japan from May 19, 2001, to May 27, 2001.

Sports
The 2001 East Asian Games featured events in 15 sports, which was a new high for the competition.

Aquatics
  Swimming
  Synchronized swimming
 Diving
 Athletics (45)
 Basketball
  Bowling

  Boxing
  Football
 Gymnastics
  Artistic gymnastics
  Rhythmic gymnastics
  Handball
  Judo

  Soft tennis
  Taekwondo
  Volleyball
  Weightlifting
 Wrestling
 Wushu
Taolu
Sanshou

Medal table

External links
Games summary from Olympic Council of Asia

 
East Asian Games
East Asian Games
E
Multi-sport events in Japan
Sport in Osaka
East Asian Games